Like a Star (stylised in all caps) is the twelfth Mandarin studio album by Taiwanese Mandopop artist Rainie Yang. It was released on 5 November 2020 through EMI, her fourth album on the sublabel of Universal Music Taiwan. This album marks Yang's twentieth anniversary since her debut. It also signifies her return to dance music, including genres such as trap and trance.

Yang also embarked on a world tour of the same name on 6 November 2020.

The album's title track, "Like a Star", was ranked 42nd on Hit FM Top 100 Singles of the Year while "Girls" was placed at 59th.

Track listing

Notes
  On Bad Lady, Li Ronghao is credited as a lyricist under the pseudonym Whale (鯨魚).

Music videos

References 

2020 albums
Rainie Yang albums
Universal Music Taiwan albums